Amelanchier utahensis, the Utah serviceberry, is a shrub or small tree native to western North America. This serviceberry grows in varied habitats, from scrubby open slopes to woodlands and forests.

Description

It is deciduous, bearing rounded or spade-shaped often toothed green leaves and losing them at the end of the season. In April and May the shrub blooms in short inflorescences of white flowers, each with five widely spaced narrow petals. The fruits are pomes. The Utah serviceberry is browsed by desert bighorns, elk, and mule deer, as well as many birds and domesticated livestock.

Range

For the Utah serviceberry, the core mountainous range is delimited by the Colorado–New Mexico–Wyoming Rocky Mountains in the east, the Front ranges of Utah at the west, and the south in central Arizona-western New Mexico by the Mogollon Rim and White Mountains (Arizona) region of east Arizona and New Mexico.

The rest of the range is centered on mountain ranges of the Great Basin, and extending west to the Sierra Nevada and chaparral and woodlands in California and as far south as extreme northern Baja California, and then in the north to southwestern Montana with Idaho.

Uses
The Utah serviceberry is generally fire tolerant and sprouts from the root crown when damaged by fire. The tree also has a high resistance to drought and high fruit abundance. Additionally, it is not susceptible to frost.

References

External links
 Ecology
 
 Jepson Manual Treatment = Amelanchier utahensis
 USDA Plants Profile: Amelanchier utahensis
 
 Lady Bird Johnson database, w/ gallery

utahensis
Flora of the Northwestern United States
Flora of the South-Central United States
Flora of the Southeastern United States
Flora of Northwestern Mexico